Microstomus is a genus of righteye flounders native to the North Pacific and Northeast Atlantic oceans.

Etymology

The word Microstomus is derived from the Greek μικρὸς (mikros), meaning "small", and στόμα (stoma), meaning "mouth".

Species
There are currently four recognized species in this genus:
 Microstomus achne (D. S. Jordan & Starks, 1904) (Slime flounder)
 Microstomus kitt (Walbaum, 1792) (Lemon sole)
 Microstomus pacificus (Lockington, 1879) (Dover sole)
 Microstomus shuntovi Borets, 1983

References

 
Pleuronectidae
Marine fish genera
Taxa named by Carl Moritz Gottsche